This is a list of Solar System objects by greatest aphelion or the greatest distance from the Sun that the orbit could take it if the Sun and object were the only objects in the universe. It is implied that the object is orbiting the Sun in a two-body solution without the influence of the planets, passing stars, or the galaxy. The aphelion can change significantly due to the gravitational influence of planets and other stars. Most of these objects are comets on a calculated path and may not be directly observable. For instance, comet Hale-Bopp was last seen in 2013 at magnitude 24 and continues to fade, making it invisible to all but the most powerful telescopes.

Oort cloud comets orbit the Sun at great distances, but can then be perturbed by passing stars and the galactic tides. As they come into or leave the inner Solar System they may have their orbit changed by the planets, or alternatively be ejected from the Solar System. It is also possible they may collide with the Sun or a planet.

Neso (the outermost moon of Neptune) takes 27 years to orbit Neptune, comets can take up to 30 million years to orbit the Sun, and the Sun orbits the Milky Way in about 230 million years (a galactic year).

Explanation

Barycentric vs heliocentric orbits

As many of the objects listed below have some of the most extreme orbits of any objects in the Solar System, describing their orbit precisely can be particularly difficult and sensitive to the time the orbit is defined at. For most objects in the Solar System, a heliocentric reference frame (relative to the gravitational center of the Sun) is sufficient to explain their orbits. However, as the orbits of objects become closer to the Solar System's escape velocity, with long orbital periods on the order of hundreds or thousands of years, a different reference frame is required to describe their orbit: a barycentric reference frame. A barycentric reference frame measures the asteroid's orbit relative to the gravitational center of the entire Solar System, rather than just the Sun. Mostly due to the influence of the outer gas giants, the Solar System barycenter varies by up to twice the radius of the Sun.

This difference in position can lead to significant changes in the orbits of long-period comets and distant asteroids. Many comets have hyperbolic (unbound) orbits in a heliocentric reference frame, but in a barycentric reference frame have much more firmly bound orbits, with only a small handful remaining truly hyperbolic.

Eccentricity and Vinf
The orbital parameter used to describe how non-circular an object's orbit is, is eccentricity (e). An object with an e of 0 has a perfectly circular orbit, with its perihelion distance being just as close to the Sun as its aphelion distance. An object with an e of between 0 and 1 will have an elliptical orbit, with, for instance, an object with an e of 0.5 having a perihelion twice as close to the Sun as its aphelion. As an object's e approaches 1, its orbit will be more and more elongated before, and at e=1, the object's orbit will be 
 parabolic and unbound to the Solar System (i.e. not returning for another orbit). An e greater than 1 will be hyperbolic and still be unbound to the Solar System.

Although it describes how "unbound" an object's orbit is, eccentricity does not necessarily reflect how high an incoming velocity said object had before entering the Solar System (a parameter known as Vinfinity, or Vinf). A clear example of this is the eccentricities of the two known Interstellar objects as of October 2019, 1I/'Oumuamua. and 2I/Borisov. In practice, no object originating from the Solar System should have an incoming heliocentric eccentricity much higher than 1, and should rarely have an incoming barycentric eccentricity of above 1, as that would imply that the object had originated from an indefinitely far distance from the Sun.

Orbital epochs
Due to having the most eccentric orbits of any Solar System body, a comet's orbit typically intersects one or more of the planets in the Solar System. As a result, the orbit of a comet is frequently perturbed significantly, even over the course of a single pass through the inner Solar System. Due to the changing orbit, it's necessary to provide a calculation of the orbit of the comet (or similarly orbiting body) both before and after entering the inner Solar System. For example, Comet ISON was ~312 au from the Sun in 1600, and its remnants will be ~431 au from the Sun in 2400, both well outside of any significant gravitational influence from the planets.

Comets with greatest aphelion (2 body heliocentric)

Distant comets with long observation arcs and/or barycentric 

Examples of comets with a more well-determined orbit. Comets are extremely small relative to other bodies and hard to observe once they stop outgassing (see Coma (cometary)). Because they are typically discovered close to the Sun, it will take some time even thousands of years for them to actually travel out to great distances. The Whipple proposal might be able to detect Oort cloud objects at great distances, but probably not a particular object.

Comet West 70,000 AU (1.1 light-years)
C/1999 F1 (Catalina) 66,600 AU (1.05 light-years)
C/2012 S4 (PANSTARRS) 5700 AU (barycentric)
Comet Hyakutake (C/1996 B2) 3410 AU
C/1910 A1 (Great January comet) about 2974 AU (barycentric)
C/1992 J1 (Spacewatch) 3650 AU
C/2007 N3 (Lulin) 2400 AU

Minor planets 

A large number of trans-Neptunian objects (TNOs) – minor planets orbiting beyond the orbit of Neptune – have been discovered in recent years. Many TNOs have orbits that take them far beyond Pluto's aphelion of 49.3 AU. The following is a list of minor planets with the largest aphelion in descending order.

Minor planets with a heliocentric aphelion greater than 400 AU 
The following group of bodies have orbits with an aphelion above 400 AU, with 1-sigma uncertainties given to two significant digits. As of October 2022, there are 66 such bodies.

Greatest barycentric aphelion
The following asteroids have an incoming barycentric aphelion of at least 1000 AU.

Comparison

See also 
 List of trans-Neptunian objects (numbered minor planets only)
 List of unnumbered trans-Neptunian objects
 List of artificial objects leaving the Solar System
 List of Solar System objects most distant from the Sun (then-year distance from the Sun)
 List of nearest stars and brown dwarfs
 List of the most distant astronomical objects
About comets
 List of hyperbolic comets
 List of comets with no meaningful orbit
 List of near-parabolic comets
 List of periodic comets
 List of numbered comets
 Interstellar object
Objects of interest
 1996 PW
 C/2015 ER61
 C/1980 E1
Others

References

External links 
 A distant planet may lurk far beyond Neptune
 Mysterious Planet X May Really Lurk Undiscovered in Our Solar System

Aphelion